The 2014 International Championship was a professional ranking snooker tournament that took place between 26 October and 2 November 2014 at the Sichuan International Tennis Center in Chengdu, China. It was the fourth ranking event of the 2014/2015 season.

Ding Junhui was the defending champion, but he lost 5–6 against amateur Wang Zepeng in the qualifying round.

Ricky Walden won his third ranking title by defeating Mark Allen 10–7 in the final.

Prize fund
The breakdown of prize money for this year is shown below:

 Winner: £125,000
 Runner-up: £65,000
 Semi-final: £30,000
 Quarter-final: £17,500
 Last 16: £12,000
 Last 32: £7,000
 Last 64: £3,000

 Televised highest break: £1,000
 Total: £625,000

Wildcard round
These matches were played in Chengdu on 26 October 2014.

Main draw

Final

Qualifying
These matches took place between 22 and 25 September 2014 at the Barnsley Metrodome in Barnsley, England. All matches were best of 11 frames.

Century breaks

Qualifying stage centuries

 136  Gary Wilson
 136  Peter Ebdon
 131  Michael White
 130  Barry Pinches
 129  Michael Wasley
 123  Anthony McGill
 120, 103  Wang Zepeng
 115  Mark Selby
 113  Neil Robertson
 112  Ding Junhui
 111  Brandon Sargeant
 109  Jack Lisowski
 109  Judd Trump
 109  Mark Allen
 108, 105  Noppon Saengkham 
 108  Matthew Stevens
 106, 100  Luca Brecel
 105  Daniel Wells
 104  Nigel Bond
 104  Oliver Brown
 103  Ken Doherty
 103  Alex Pagulayan
 103  Kyren Wilson
 103  Joe Swail
 102  Martin Gould
 101  Dominic Dale

Televised stage centuries

 142  Mitchell Mann
 141, 134, 127, 108, 106  Marco Fu
 141, 132, 115, 111, 107, 103, 100, 100  Ricky Walden
 140  Stephen Maguire
 139  Graeme Dott
 139  Zhao Xintong
 135, 128  Stuart Bingham
 135, 120, 120, 105, 102  Mark Williams
 130  Ryan Day
 129, 101  Mark Davis
 127, 104  Mark Joyce
 126  Fergal O'Brien
 124, 116, 112, 101  Ronnie O'Sullivan
 123  Ian Burns
 122  Xiao Guodong
 121  Sam Baird
 118, 117, 113, 108, 105, 100  Mark Allen
 115  Mike Dunn
 107, 101, 100  Martin Gould
 107  Joe Perry
 106, 101  Neil Robertson
 106  Dominic Dale
 105  Joel Walker
 105  Zhou Yuelong
 104  Rod Lawler
 103  Anthony McGill
 102  Judd Trump
 101  Craig Steadman

References

External links
 2014 International Championship – Pictures by Tai Chengzhe at Facebook

2014
International Championship
International Championship
October 2014 sports events in China
November 2014 sports events in China
2014 International Championship